Mathura is a city and the administrative headquarters of Mathura district in the Indian state of Uttar Pradesh. In ancient times, Mathura was an economic hub, located at the junction of important caravan routes. The 2011 Census of India estimated the population of Mathura at 441,894.

In Hinduism, Mathura is the birthplace of Krishna, which is located at the Krishna Janmasthan Temple Complex. It is one of the Sapta Puri, the seven cities considered holy by Hindus, also is called Mokshyadayni Tirth. The Kesava Deo Temple was built in ancient times on the site of Krishna's birthplace (an underground prison). Mathura was the capital of the kingdom of Surasena, ruled by Kansa, the maternal uncle of Krishna. Mathura is part of the Krishna circuit (Mathura,Vrindavan,Barsana, Govardhan, Kurukshetra, Dwarka and Bhalka). Janmashtami is grandly celebrated in Mathura every year.

Mathura has been chosen as one of the heritage cities for the Heritage City Development and Augmentation Yojana scheme of Government of India.

History
Traditionally it is believed that it was founded by Satrughana after killing Yadava Lavana at the site of Madhuvana. According to Ramayana it was founded by Madhu (a man of the Yadu tribe). Later on Madhu's son Lavanasura was defeated by Satrughana. Madhu says all the territory of Mathura belongs to Abhiras.

Mathura, which lies at the centre of the cultural region of Braj has an ancient history and is also believed to be the homeland and birthplace of Krishna, who belonged to the Yadu dynasty. According to the Archaeological Survey of India plaque at the Mathura Museum, the city is mentioned in the oldest Indian epic, the Ramayana. In the epic, the Ikshwaku prince Shatrughna slays a demon called Lavanasura and claims the land. Afterwards, the place came to be known as Madhuvan as it was thickly wooded, then Madhupura and later Mathura. The most important pilgrimage site in Mathura was Katra ('market place'), now referred to as Krishna Janmasthan ('the birthplace of Krishna'). Excavations at the site revealed pottery and terracotta dating to the sixth century BCE, the remains of a large Buddhist complex, including a monastery called Yasha Vihara of the Gupta period, as well as Jain sculptures of the same era.

Ancient history
Archaeological excavations at Mathura show the gradual growth of a village into an important city during the Vedic age. The earliest period belonged to the Painted Grey Ware culture (1100–500 BCE), followed by the Northern Black Polished Ware culture (700–200 BCE). Mathura derived its importance as a center of trade due to its location where the northern trade route of the Indo-Gangetic Plain met with the routes to Malwa (central India) and the west coast. Archaeologists have discovered a fragment of Mathura red sandstone from Rakhigarhi - a site of Indus Valley civilization dated to third millennium BCE - which was used as a grindstone; red sandstone was also a popular material for historic period sculptures.

By the sixth century BCE Mathura became the capital of the Surasena Kingdom. The city was later ruled by the Maurya empire (fourth to second centuries BCE). Megasthenes, writing in the early third century BCE, mentions Mathura as a great city under the name Μέθορα (Méthora). It seems it never was under the direct control of the following Shunga dynasty (2nd century BCE) as not a single archaeological remain of a Shunga presence were ever found in Mathura.

The Indo-Greeks may have taken control, direct or indirect, of Mathura some time between 180 BCE and 100 BCE, and remained so as late as 70 BCE according to the Yavanarajya inscription, which was found in Maghera, a town  from Mathura. The opening of the 3 line text of this inscription in Brahmi script translates as: "In the 116th year of the Yavana kingdom..." or '"In the 116th year of Yavana hegemony" ("Yavanarajya") However, this also corresponds to the presence of the native Mitra dynasty of local rulers in Mathura, in approximately the same time frame (150 BCE—50 BCE), possibly pointing to a vassalage relationship with the Indo-Greeks.

Indo-Scythians
After a period of local rule, Mathura was conquered by the Indo-Scythians during the first century BCE. The Indo-Scythian satraps of Mathura are sometimes called the "Northern Satraps", as opposed to the "Western Satraps" ruling in Gujarat and Malwa. However, Indo-Scythian control proved to be short lived, following the reign of the Indo-Scythian Mahakshatrapa ("Great Satrap") Rajuvula, –25 CE. The Mora Well inscription of Mahakshatrapa Rajuvula, of the early decades of the first century CE, found in a village seven miles from Mathura, stated that images pratima(h) of the blessed (bhagavatam) five Vrishni heroes, were installed in a stone shrine of a person called Tosa. The heroes were identified from a passage in the Vayu Purana as Samkarsana, Vasudev, Pradyumna, Samba, and Aniruddha. The English translation of the inscription read:-

The Mathura inscription of the time of Mahakshatrapa Rajuvula's son, Mahakshatrapa Sodasa recorded erection of a torana (gateway), vedika (terrace) and chatuhsala (quadrangle) at the Mahasthana (great place) of Bhagavat Vasudeva. Several male torsos representing the Vrisni heroes were also found in a shrine in Mora dating to the time of Mahakshatrapa Sodasa.

Kushan Empire
During the rule of the great Kushanas, art and culture flourished in the region and reached new heights and is now famously known as the Mathura School of Art. The Kushans took control of Mathura some time after Mahakshatrapa Sodasa, although several of his successors ruled as Kushans vassals, such as the Indo-Scythian "Great Satrap" Kharapallana and the "Satrap" Vanaspara, both of whom paid allegiance to the Kushans in an inscription at Sarnath, dating to the third year of the reign of the Kushan emperor Kanishka the Great  CE. Mathuran art and culture reached its zenith under the Kushan dynasty which had Mathura as one of its capitals. The preceding capitals of the Kushans included Kapisa (modern Bagram, Afghanistan), Purushapura (modern Peshawar, Pakistan) and Takshasila/Sirsukh/ (modern Taxila, Pakistan). Mathura ateliers were most active during the epoch of the great Kushan emperors Kanishka, Huvishka, Vasudeva whose reign represents the Golden Age of Mathura sculpture. During the third century, Nagas ruled Mathura after decline of Kushan Empire.

Gupta Empire
In the reign of Chandragupta Vikramaditya, a magnificent temple of Vishnu was built at the site of Katra Keshavadeva. Kalidasa, hailed as the greatest poet and dramatist in Sanskrit, in the fourth-fifth century CE mentioned the groves of Vrindavan and Govardhan hill as:

Chinese Buddhist Monk Faxian mentions the city as a centre of Buddhism about 400 CE. He found the people were very well off, there were no taxes other than for those on farmers who tilled the royal land. He found that people did not kill animals, no one consumed wine, and did not eat onion or garlic.  He found that engraved title deeds were issued to land owners. Visiting priests were provided with accommodation, beds, mats, food, drinks and clothes to perform scholarly works.

Harsha Empire
Xuanzang, who visited the city in 634 CE, mentions it as Mot'ulo, recording that it contained twenty Buddhist monasteries and five Hindu temples. Later, he went east to Thanesar, Jalandhar in the eastern Punjab, before climbing up to visit predominantly Theravada monasteries in the Kulu valley and turning southward again to Bairat and then Mathura, on the Yamuna river.

Medieval History and Islamic Invasions

Early Middle Ages
The famous female Alvar saint, Andal visualized going to a pilgrimage which began at Mathura, then proceeded to Gokul, the Yamuna, the pool of Kaliya, Vrindavan, Govardhan, and finished at Dwarka. The eleventh century Kashmiri poet, Bilhana visited Mathura and Vrindavan after leaving Kashmir en route to Karnataka.

High Middle Ages
The city was sacked and many of its temples destroyed by Mahmud of Ghazni in 1018 CE. The capture of Mathura by Maḥmūd Ibn Sebüktegīn is described by the historian al-Utbi (Abu Nasr Muhammad ibn Muhammad al Jabbaru-l 'Utbi) in his work Tarikh Yamini as follows:

The temple at Katra was sacked by Maḥmūd Ibn Sebüktegīn. A temple was built to replace it in 1150 CE. The Mathura prasasti (Eulogistic Inscription) dated Samvat (V.S.) 1207 (1150 CE), said to have been found in 1889 CE at the Keshava mound by Anton Fuhrer, German Indologist who worked with the Archaeological Survey of India, recorded the foundations of a temple dedicated to Vishnu at the Katra site:

Jajja was a vassal of the Gahadavalas in charge of Mathura, and the committee mentioned in the prasasti could have been of an earlier Vaishnava temple. The temple built by Jajja at Katra was destroyed by the forces of Qutubuddin Aibak, though Feroz Tughlaq (r. 1351–88 CE) was also said to have attacked it. It was repaired and survived till the reign of Sikandar Lodi (r. 1489–1517 CE).

In the twelfth century, Bhatta Lakshmidhara, chief minister of the Gahadavala king Govindachandra (r. 1114–1155 CE), wrote the earliest surviving collection of verses in praise of the sacred sites of Mathura in his work Krtyakalpataru, which has been described as "the first re-statement of the theory of Tirtha-yatra (pilgrimage)". In his Krtyakalpataru, Bhatta Lakshmidhara devoted an entire section (9) to Mathura.
  
Later on the city was sacked again by Sikandar Lodi, who ruled the Sultanate of Delhi from 1489 to 1517 CE. Sikandar Lodi earned the epithet of 'Butt Shikan', the 'Destroyer of Idols'. Ferishta recorded that Sikandar Lodi was a staunch Muslim, with a passion for vandalizing heathen temples:

In Tarikh-i Daudi, of 'Abdu-lla (written during the time of Jahangir) said of Sikandar Lodi:

Vallabhacharya and Chaitanya Mahaprabhu arrived in the Braj region, in search of sacred places that had been destroyed or lost. In Shrikrsnashrayah, that make up the Sodashagrantha, Vallabha said of his age:

Late Middle Ages

The Portuguese, Father Antonio Monserrate (1536 CE-1600 CE), who was on a Jesuit mission at the Mughal Court during the times of Akbar, visited Mathura in 1580–82, and noted that all temples built at sites associated with the deeds of Krishna were in ruins:-

The Keshavadeva temple was rebuilt by the Bundela Rajput Rajah Vir Singh Deo at a cost of thirty-three lakh rupees when the gold was priced at around ₹ 10/- per tola. And the grand structure of the temple in Mathura was regarded a "wonder of the age".

The Mughal Emperor Aurangzeb, built the Shahi-Eidgah Mosque during his rule, which is adjacent to Shri Krishna Janmabhoomi believed to be over a Hindu temple. He also changed the city's name to Islamabad. In 1669, Aurangzeb issued a general order for the demolition of Hindu schools and temples, in 1670, specifically ordered the destruction of the Keshavadeva temple. Saqi Mustaid Khan recorded:

The Muslim conquest resulted in the destruction of all Buddhist, Jain, and Hindu temples and monuments in and around Mathura. Buddhism, already in decline, never revived, and for the next four hundred years the Jains and Hindus were unable to erect any temples that were not sooner or later demolished. Many of the sites that had been places of religious importance were abandoned and gradually sank beneath the earth. But some of them were not forgotten, owing to the persistence of oral tradition, the refashioning of a temple into a mosque, or the presence of humble shrines, some of which housed sculptural fragments of earlier buildings. Several of them have survived as places of significance in the modern pilgrimage circuit.

"The rebellion in Mathurá district seems to have gained ground. 'On the 14th Rajab, 1080, [28 November 1669], his Majesty left Dihlí for Akbarábád, and almost daily enjoyed the pleasures of the chase. On the 21st Rajab, whilst hunting, he received the report of a rebellion having broken out at Mauza' Rewarah, Chandarkah, and Surkhrú. Hasan 'Ali Khán was ordered to attack the rebels at night, which he did, and the firing lasted till 12 o'clock the next day. The rebels, unable longer to withstand, thinking of the honour of their families, now fought with short arms, and many imperial soldiers and companions of Hasan ’Alí were killed. Three hundred rebels were sent to perdition, and two hundred and fifty, men and women, caught. Hasan ’Alí, in the afternoon, reported personally the result of the fight, and was ordered to leave the prisoners and the cattle in charge of Sayyid Zain ul-'Abidin, the jágirdár of the place. Çaf Shikan Khán also (who after ’Abdunnabí's death had been appointed Faujdár of Mathura) waited on the emperor, and was ordered to tell off two hundred troopers to guard the fields attached to the villages, and prevent soldiers from plundering and kidnapping children. Námdár Khán, Faujdár of Murádábád, also came to pay his respects. Çafshikan Khán was removed from his office, and Hasan 'Ali Khán was appointed Faujdár of Mathura, with a command of Three Thousand and Five Hundred, 2000 troopers, and received a dress of honour, a sword, and a horse. * * * On the 18th Sha'bán [1st January, 1670), his Majesty entered Agrah. Kokilá Ját, the wicked ringleader of the rebels of District*......, who had been the cause of ’Abdunnabí's death and who had plundered Parganah Sa'dábád, was at last caught by Hasan ’Alí Khán and his zealous peshkár, Shaikh Razíuddin, and he was now sent with the Shaikh to Agrah, where by order of his Majesty he was executed. Kokila's son and daughter were given to Jawahir Khán Nazir [a eunuch]. The girl was later married to Shah Quli, the well-known Chelah; and his son, who was called Fázil, became in time so excellent a Hafiz [one who knows the Qorán by heart], that his Majesty preferred him to all others and even chaunted passages to him. Shaikh Razíuddin, who had captured Kokila, belonged to a respectable family in Bhagalpur, Bihár, and was an excellent soldier, administrator, and companion; he was at the same time so learned, that he was ordered to assist in the compilation of the Fatáwá i 'Alamgiri [the great code of Muhammadan laws]. He received a daily allowance of three rupees.'+ (Haásir i ’Alamgiri, pp. 92 to 91.) Hasan ’Alí Khán retained his office from 1080 to Sha'bán 1087 (October, 1676), when Sulțán Qulí Khán was appointed Faujdír of Mathurá.", Asiatic Society of Bengal, Proceedings

Early Modern History

According the biographer of Raja Jai Singh, Atmaram, when Jai Singh was campaigning against the Jat Raja Churaman Singh, he bathed at Radha kund on the full moon of Kartik, went to Mathura in the month of Shravan in 1724, and performed the marriage of his daughter on Janmashtami. He then undertook a tour of the sacred forests of Braj, and, on his return to Mathura, founded religious establishments and celebrated Holi.

Pilgrimage by the Family of Peshwa of Maratha Empire

During the period of the expansion of Maratha Empire, pilgrimage to the holy places in the north became quite frequent. Pilgrims required protection on the way and took advantage of the constant movement of troops that journeyed to and back from their homeland for military purposes. That is how the practice arose of ladies accompanying military expeditions. The mother of Peshwa Balaji Baji Rao, Kashitai performed her famous pilgrimage for four years in the north, visiting Mathura, Prayag, Ayodhya, Banaras, and other holy places.

Religious heritage

Mathura is a holy city in Hinduism and is considered the heart of Brij Bhoomi, the land of Krishna. The twin-city to Mathura is Vrindavan.

There are many places of historic and religious importance in Mathura and its neighbouring towns.

Krishna Janmasthan Temple Complex is an important group of temples built around what is considered to be the birthplace of Krishna. The temple complex contains Keshav Deva temple, Garbha Griha shrine, Bhagavata Bhavan and the Rangabhoomi where the final battle between Krishna and Kamsa took place.

The Dwarkadheesh Temple is one of the largest temples in Mathura. Vishram Ghat at the bank of river Yamuna is said to be the place were Krishna had rested after killing Kamsa.

Other notable Hindu religious sites and heritage locations includes the Gita Mandir, Govind Dev temple, ISKCON temple, Kusum Sarovar, Naam yog Sadhna Mandir, Peepleshwar Mahadeo Temple and Yum Yamuna Temple

Kankali Tila brought forth many treasures of Jain art. The archaeological findings testify the existence of two Jain temples and stupas. Numerous Jain sculptures, Ayagapatas (tablet of homage), pillars, crossbeams and lintels were found during archaeological excavations. Some of the sculptures are provided with inscriptions that report on the contemporary society and organization of the Jain community.

Most sculptures could be dated from the second century BC to the 12th century CE, thus representing a continuous period of about 14 centuries during which Jainism flourished at Mathura. These sculptures are now housed in the Lucknow State Museum and in the Mathura Museum.

The Mathura Museum is notable for archaeological artefacts, especially those from the Kushan and Gupta empires. It has sculptures associated with Hinduism, Buddhism and Jainism.

Festivals

Krishna Janmashtami is grandly celebrated every year in Mathura. Every year 3 to 3.5 million devotees celebrate Janmashtami in Mathura, with the maximum number of devotees visiting the Keshav Deva temple and the Dwarkadheesh temple. Devotees generally observe a fast and break it at midnight when Krishna was believed to have been born. Devotional songs, dance performances, bhog and aartis are observed across Mathura-Vrindavan.

Geography
It has an average elevation of 174 metres (570 feet).

Climate

Demographics

The 2011 census of India estimates the population of Mathura to be 441,894, with a decadal growth rate of 22.53 per cent. Males account for 54% (268,445) and females for 46% (173,449) of this population. Sex ratio of Mathura is 858 females per 1000 males, which has increased from 840 (2001). However, national sex ratio is 940. Population density in 2011 has increased from 621 per km2 in 2001 to 761 per km2. Mathura has an average literacy rate of 72.65 per cent which has increased from 61.46 percent (2001) but still lower than the national average of 74.04 per cent. Male and female literacy rate are 84.39 and 58.93 per cent respectively. 15.61 percent of Mathura's population is under 6 years of age. This figure was 19.56 per cent in 2001 census.

Languages
According to the 2011 census on Mathura NPP, 95.4% of the people identified as Hindi speakers, 2.6% as Urdu speakers and 1.4% as speakers of Braj Bhasha (the local dialect). The city also lies within the cultural region of Braj.

Government and politics
Actress turned political leader, Hema Malini is the sitting MP of holy constituency Mathura in Uttar Pradesh.

Transportation

Rail

Mathura Junction railway station is situated on the major Delhi-Mumbai rail route. Both Central Railway and Western Railway routes pass through Mathura. Trains from NCR (north-central railway) to ER (eastern railway) also pass through the Mathura junction. Mathura Cantt railway station is a major route for eastern and central railway.

Important trains that originate/terminate at Mathura are:
 12177/Howrah – Mathura Chambal Express.

Road
Mathura is well-connected by road to the rest of India. National Highway NH-19(previously NH-2) from Delhi to Kolkata, with diversion for Chennai also passes through Mathura. Yamuna Expressway from Greater-Noida to Agra (165 km 6 lane access controlled express highway) also passes through, providing good connectivity to Noida, Agra, Kanpur and Lucknow.

Tram
A tram network has been proposed in the city, which would make Mathura the second only city in India (besides Kolkata) to have a functional tram transport. In 2017, the local MLA Shrikant Sharma announced that the trams will be operational in Mathura and Vrindavan by 2018.

Air
Currently the city has no airport. The nearest airports are the Agra Airport (about 60 km away) and the Delhi Airport (about 160 km away) with major national and international air routes.The under-construction Jewar Airport in Greater Noida is approximately 75 km from Mathura and is expected to be country's largest airport when fully operational. Land has been earmarked, and construction is in progress near the Yamuna Expressway, with plans to open in the next five years with regular flights to major national and international air routes in future.

In 2012, the then civil aviation minister Ajit Singh suggested Mathura's name for the site of a new greenfield international airport to the then chief minister of Uttar Pradesh, Akhilesh Yadav. Mathura's name came to note when a group of ministers terminated the plan of building Taj International Airport at Agra.

Strategic importance

I Corps (Strike Formation) within the Indian Army's Central Command is based in Mathura, hosting Strike I Corps headquarters in a large classified area in the outskirts of the city known as Mathura Cantonment (Central Command is headquartered in Lucknow). It hosts Strike Infantry units, air defence units, armoured divisions, engineer brigades, artillery Units, and classified units of Strategic Forces Command. The I Corps is primarily responsible for the western borders of India. In 2007 during Exercise Ashwamedha, all the armoured, artillery, and infantry divisions performed a simulation of an overall NBC (nuclear-chemical-biological) environment. The aim was to show operational ability in high intensity, short duration and 'sudden' battle

Industries
Mathura Refinery located in the city is one of the biggest oil refineries of Asia with a refining capacity of 8.0 million tonnes per year. This oil refinery of Indian Oil Corporation Ltd. is a technologically advanced oil refinery and provides local employment opportunities as well. Its main focus is to meet the  demands from the NCR. The refinery had undertaken projects to upgrade its diesel and gasoline units to bring Sulphur levels down by nearly 80 percent

Media and communications
The city has a local station of the All India Radio.

Educational institutions
 GLA University
 Sachdeva Institute of Technology
 Sanskriti University
 U.P. Pt. Deen Dayal Upadhyaya Veterinary Science University and Cattle Research Institute

See also
 Mathur (disambiguation)
 Brij Bhoomi
 Gokul
 Kankali Tila
 Nandgaon
 Goverdhan
 Sonkh

References

Citations

Sources
 Mathura-The Cultural Heritage. Edited by Doris Meth Srinivasan, published in 1989 by AIIS/Manohar.
 Konow, Sten. Editor. 1929. Kharoshthī Inscriptions with Exception of those of Ashoka. Corpus Inscriptionum Indicarum, Vol. II, Part I. Reprint: Indological Book House, Varanasi, 1969.
 Mukherjee, B. N. 1981. Mathurā and its Society: The Śaka-Pahlava Phase. Firma K. L. M. Private Limited, Calcutta.
 Sharma, R. C. 1976. Mathura Museum and Art. 2nd revised and enlarged edition. Government Museum, Mathura.
 Growse, F. S. 1882. " Mathura A District Memoir.
 Drake-Brockman, D. L. 1911. "Muttra A Gaztteer".
 The Jain stûpa and other antiquities of Mathura, by Smith, Vincent Arthur, 1848–1920. (1901)
 1018: Mahmud Ghazni’s invasion of Mathura

External links

 Entry on Mathura in the Dictionary on Pali Proper Names

 
Hindu holy cities
Hindu pilgrimage sites in India
Buddhist pilgrimage sites in India
Cities and towns in Mathura district
Former capital cities in India
Cities in Uttar Pradesh
Locations in Hindu mythology
Holy cities
Ancient Indian cities
Hindu pilgrimages
Krishna temples
Hinduism
Krishna
Religious tourism in India